"Time" is a song by American rock band Hootie & the Blowfish. It was released on October 24, 1995, as the fourth single from their 1994 debut album, Cracked Rear View. "Time" peaked at number 14 on the US Billboard Hot 100 and reached number one in Canada for a week in February 1996. The song also peaked at number one on the Billboard Adult Top 40, number nine in Iceland, and number 35 in New Zealand.

Music video
The song's music video, directed by Frank Sacramento and produced by Myke Zykoff, was filmed in Charleston, South Carolina.

Track listings
US CD single
 "Time"
 "Use Me"
 "The Ballad of John & Yoko"

US 7-inch single
A. "Time" – 4:53
B. "Only Wanna Be with You" – 3:46

US cassette single
 "Time"
 "Goodbye" (non-LP live version)

Charts

Weekly charts

Year-end charts

References

1995 singles
Atlantic Records singles
Hootie & the Blowfish songs
RPM Top Singles number-one singles
Song recordings produced by Don Gehman
Songs written by Darius Rucker
Songs written by Jim Sonefeld
Songs written by Mark Bryan